Stan Savran (born Stanley George Savransky on February 25, 1947 in Cleveland, Ohio) is an American sports media personality based in Pittsburgh, Pennsylvania. He is a member of the Western Pennsylvania Sports Hall of Fame and a member of the Pittsburgh Pirates Media Wall of Fame.

Current work
Savran is best known for his time on Fox Sports Net Pittsburgh, where he co-hosted a talk show with Guy Junker, "Stan Savran and Guy Junker on Sportsbeat." His twitter handle (@StanLoveTheShow) is based on the greeting given him during his time hosting Sportsbeat, "Stan, Guy, love the show."

Savran has been working for Fox Sports Pittsburgh since 1991, when it was known as KBL. For 17 years, he was the host/co-host of Savran on Sportsbeat, shown weeknights from 6:30–7:30 pm on Fox Sports Pittsburgh.  Sportsbeat was the longest running sports show in Pittsburgh television history.

It was announced July 7, 2009, via Bob Smizik's online blog on postgazette.com, that Savran on Sportsbeat was cancelled by FSN Pittsburgh and Stan Savran's future with the station was up in the air. However, it was announced on July 11, 2009 that Stan Savran agreed to a new contract with FSN. As a result, Savran will be the primary host for Penguins and Pirates pregame shows and also will continue to be the host of the Mike Tomlin Press Conference and The Mike Tomlin Show. A special 2 hour series finale of Sportsbeat aired on Monday July 13, 2009.

Savran on Sportsbeat was considered a lifeline to Pittsburgh natives who had scattered throughout the country – a way to touch base and get the news and opinions regarding Pittsburgh sports. The show had a regular run of guests, including Mr. Monday Night, Former Steelers tackle Tunch Ilkin, Steelers defensive back Ike Taylor, Pittsburgh Penguins forward Max Talbot and fantasy football expert Duane Cahill.

From 2001 to 2006, Savran was heard 3–6 pm weekdays on Fox Sports Radio 970, WBGG (AM).  His radio show was canceled on July 7, 2006, due to a station format change.

On August 4, 2008, Savran teamed up once again with Junker. Their show was aired ESPN Radio 1250AM WEAE, in the 10:00 am – 2:00 pm time slot until 2010.

On September 24, 2010 ESPN Radio 1250 announced that they would be switching to Radio Disney and would cease carrying local personalities on their station. However, as of October 2010, Savran is back on 970 AM as part of the station switching to ESPN Radio. His current show, Savran on Sports, can be heard in the 12:00 – 2:00 pm time slot.

Career history
Savran worked at a number of radio jobs after graduating from Miami University in Oxford, Ohio. His stops included Columbus, Lawton, OK and Orlando, FL, where he called play-by-play in the World Football League in 1974-75. Savran came to Pittsburgh in January 1976 by responding to a "blind" ad for a radio sportscaster in the classified section of Broadcasting magazine.

His first on-air job in Pittsburgh was at for WWSW-AM. When WWSW changed formats in 1979, he moved to KQV.

From 1981–1991, he was an everyday sports reporter, both from the news desk and on location, for WTAE-TV.  He also hosted an 8-9 pm talk show on WTAE Radio, now WPGP. Savran earned such praise for his patience, knowledge, and style that a local newspaper columnist retrospectively referred to the pairing of that show and Myron Cope's show in the 6-8 pm timeslot as "the Golden Era of Pittsburgh sports talk." Savran left for KBL/Fox Sports Net after a dispute with management.

From 2000–2004, he wrote weekly sports columns for the Pittsburgh Post-Gazette, the largest newspaper in Pittsburgh.

Savran was a sports anchor for WTAE-TV and WPGH-TV, both in Pittsburgh. He also hosted intermission segments on Pittsburgh Penguins broadcasts when the games were on WPGH and continues to do so occasionally for AT&T SportsNet Pittsburgh.

Awards and honors 

 Member of the Western Pennsylvania Sports Hall of Fame (2003) 
 Member of the Pittsburgh Pirates Media Wall of Fame (2018)

References

External links
Stan Savran's 970 ESPN blog
Savran interview
Stan Savran on Twitter

National Hockey League broadcasters
Major League Baseball broadcasters
American sports radio personalities
American television talk show hosts
Miami University alumni
Living people
Television personalities from Pittsburgh
Pittsburgh Pirates announcers
Pittsburgh Penguins announcers
World Football League announcers
1947 births
Sportswriters from Pennsylvania